Guérillot is a surname. Notable people with the surname include:

Amanzia Guérillot (1828–1886), Italian artist of French heritage
Roger Guérillot (1904–1971), French politician and diplomat

French-language surnames